Start to Feel is the sixth studio album by German progressive trance duo Cosmic Gate. It was released on June 26, 2014 through Armada Music.

Track listing
 "Happyness" (6:21)
 "Falling Back" (4:39) (with Eric Lumiere)
 "Fair Game" (4:56) (with Ørjan Nilsen)
 "Alone" (4:51) (with Kristina Antuna)
 "No One Can Touch You Now" (5:49) (with Mike Schmid)
 "Telefunken" (4:39) (with Jerome Isma-Ae)
 "Run Away" (4:57) (with Eric Lumiere)
 "Going Home" (4:33) (with Emma Hewitt)
 "Sparks After the Sunset" (4:02) (with Sarah Lynn)
 "Yai" (5:41)
 "So Get Up" (4:26)
 "Try" (4:19) (with Jaren)
 "Start to Feel" (5:45) (with Cary Brothers)
 "Shine Forever" (5:32) (with Alexander Popov and Jannika)
 "Crushed" (4:54)
 "Tormenta" (4:43) (with  KhoMha)
 "Falling Back" (Radio Edit) (3:39) (with Eric Lumiere) iTunes bonus track
 "All My Life" (5:11) (with Jonathan Mendelsohn) iTunes bonus track

Charts

References

Cosmic Gate albums
2014 albums
Armada Music albums